The men's double sculls competition at the 2017 World Rowing Championships in Sarasota took place in Nathan Benderson Park.

Schedule
The schedule was as follows:

All times are Eastern Daylight Time (UTC-4)

Results

Heats
The two fastest boats in each heat advanced directly to the A/B semifinals. The remaining boats were sent to the repechages.

Heat 1

Heat 2

Heat 3

Heat 4

Repechages
The two fastest boats in each repechage advanced to the A/B semifinals. The remaining boats were sent to the C/D semifinals.

Repechage 1

Repechage 2

Semifinals C/D
The three fastest boats in each semi were sent to the C final. The remaining boats were sent to the D final.

Semifinal 1

Semifinal 2

Semifinals A/B
The three fastest boats in each semi advanced to the A final. The remaining boats were sent to the B final.

Semifinal 1

Semifinal 2

Finals
The A final determined the rankings for places 1 to 6. Additional rankings were determined in the other finals.

Final D

Final C

Final B

Final A

References

2017 World Rowing Championships